Fun Song Factory is a British preschool children's television series and video series. It was originally created in 1994 by Will Brenton and Iain Lauchlan, who at the time, were part of the Playdays production team. The series was produced through their studio Tell-Tale Productions, and was originally released as a Direct-to-video series through Abbey Home Entertainment (and later PolyGram Video)'s "Tempo-Pre-School" imprint.

Format
The series centers around a factory where music is created. In it, live presenters alongside children come inside and sing a number of nursery rhymes, which depend on per episode.

Original production
The first production was a show made exclusively for release on VHS, filmed at the Polka Theatre in Wimbledon, presented by Iain Lauchlan, Sarah Davison and Dave Benson Phillips.

The video was a commercial success and led to a second being filmed at Chicken Shed in North London, this time presented by Iain, Dave and Michelle Durler. Following the success of the second tape, another five were produced, which began a transition more to the later-produced television series format. With this, a fully-costumed dog character named Ozzy Octave (voiced by Nick Mercer) would be introduced, who would be the foreman of the Fun Song Factory. Other characters introduced were Fred Fixer (voiced by Iain Lauchlan), Talking paint pots and Sally Cat (voiced by Sally Preisig). The specials featured costumed appearances from Postman Pat, Rupert Bear, SuperTed, Bump the Elephant and Dusty the Dinosaur.

GMTV Series (1998)
After the original 7 videos sold a combined total of 750,000 copies in the UK, a full TV series of 23 episodes was commissioned by GMTV in 1998. For the TV series Dave Benson Phillips became the main presenter and appeared in every episode. The other presenters who appeared in this series rotated from Katy Stephens (Returning from the Fun and Games DTV feature), Alex Lovell (Her first television role), Justin Fletcher (Also his first television role), and Karl Woolley. Nick Mercer reprises his role as Ozzy Octave and also performed Old MacDonald in the episode "Farm Animals" (whom Lauchlan previously appeared as in the Old MacDonald's Farm DTV feature), Mercer previously was The Grand Old Duke of York in the Nursery Rhyme Land DTV feature. Lauchlan would reprise the role of Fred and Preisig would reprise the role of Sally, The paint pots would also return. A new character, a talking factory hooter named Hooter was introduced. This show was nominated for a BAFTA in 1998.

CITV series (2004) 
In 2004, CITV commissioned an updated version of the show featuring an all-new cast. The CITV series featured a format that was similar to other children's music shows like Hi-5, and the episodes lasted at a shorter 10 minute length instead of the previous 20-minute length.

The cast members in this version used acting names instead of their real names, with the characters being Melody (Laura Hamilton), OJ and Cookie (Chris Till and Aston Merrygold, the latter later of the boyband JLS), Paige (Polly Parsons) and Cal (Kerry Newell). Ozzy Octave and the paint pots were the only characters who returned for the series, with Ozzy now voiced by Justin Fletcher. A new character was also introduced, Ozzy's nephew named Harry (voiced by Jane H. Pickworth).

Live Shows (1994-97)
Fun Song Factory (1 December 1994) - Presented by Iain Lauchlan, Sarah Davison and Dave Benson Phillips (featuring Postman Pat, Rupert Bear, SuperTed and Dusty the Dinosaur)
Fun Song Factory 2 (5 January 1996) - Presented by Iain Lauchlan, Michelle Durler and Dave Benson Phillips (featuring Postman Pat, Rupert Bear and SuperTed)
Party Time at the Fun Song Factory (26 July 1996) - Presented by Iain Lauchlan, Sarah Davison and Dave Benson Phillips
The Fun Song Factory at Old MacDonald's Farm (28 September 1996) - Presented by Iain Lauchlan, Sarah Davison and Dave Benson Phillips
Christmas at the Fun Song Factory (30 November 1996) - Presented by Iain Lauchlan, Sarah Davison and Dave Benson Phillips
Fun Song Factory - Fun and Games (24 September 1997) - Presented by Iain Lauchlan, Katy Stephens and Dave Benson Phillips (featuring Postman Pat, SuperTed and Bump the Elephant)
Fun Song Factory - Nursery Rhyme Land (5 November 1997) - Presented by Iain Lauchlan, Sarah Davison and Dave Benson Phillips (featuring SuperTed)

Fun Song Factory (GMTV series) episodes

Magical Musical Market
In 2019 creator and original presenter Iain Lauchlan produced a new series titled "Magical Musical Market" for his production company "Checky Chimps TV". The show is designed to fit a similar format as Fun Song Factory itself but instead is set in a market. Lauchlan presents each episode along with two children. The children visit a different stall and meet its owner (played by Lauchlan) and then sing a song related to an item being sold. At the beginning of each episode Lauchlan and the children must sing a song in order for the market to open. Many of the songs featured were carried over from Fun Song. Episodes were also broadcast on its official YouTube channel.

References 

1998 British television series debuts
2006 British television series endings
ITV children's television shows
British preschool education television series
British television shows featuring puppetry
1990s preschool education television series
2000s preschool education television series
ITV comedy
British children's musical groups